The Forum Baths of Trier (German: Thermen am Viehmarkt or Viehmarktthermen) are a ruin of a Roman bath complex in Augusta Treverorum, modern-day Trier, Germany. The baths were discovered in 1987.

History

Roman Period
The Forum Baths of Trier were converted in the 4th century C.E. from some older buildings, dated to around the 2nd century C.E.. The structure encompassed 8364 m² The bath house utilized the passive heating of the sun, like many Roman baths, and oriented the caldarium and tepidarium to the south, and the frigidarium to the north.

Along with the other bathhouses, the Forum Baths remained in use through the end of the fourth century. But the complex fell out of use during the early fifth century as Trier was repeatedly sacked during the Migration Period.

Later Use
In the 13th century, the remains of the bath began being used as a quarry for local buildings. In the 17th and 18th centuries, the Capuchin Order built some of the buildings for their monastery over the eastern part of the bathhouse. In 1802, the monastery was dissolved and nine years later, in 1811, the garden was transformed into a cattle market (German: Viehmarkt), from which the ruins get their name.

Gallery

See also
 Ancient Roman bathing 
 Thermae
 Barbara Baths
 Trier Imperial Baths
 List of Roman public baths

References

External links
Place of Interest: Forum Baths
Viehmarktthermen
Trier, Viehmarkt Baths

Buildings and structures in Trier
Ancient Roman baths
History of Trier
Ancient Roman buildings and structures in Germany